Deshorn Dwayne Brown (born 22 December 1990), is a Jamaican professional footballer who plays as a forward.

Club career

Early and collegiate
A native of Jamaica, Brown attended St. Elizabeth Technical High School. He then moved to the United States to attend the University of Mobile in Alabama. After his sophomore year, he transferred to the University of Central Florida. In 2013, he elected to forgo his senior year to enter the MLS SuperDraft.

Professional
Brown was selected by the Colorado Rapids with the sixth overall pick (first round) of the 2013 MLS SuperDraft on 17 January 2013. He scored his first professional goal on 16 March 2013 in a game against the Real Salt Lake. The goal came in the 37th minute and the game resulted in a 1–1 tie. During the 2013 season, Brown achieved many accomplishments. He earned the 2013 Rapids Golden Boot award leading the team with 10 goals and also lead all MLS rookies in scoring as well, just one shy of the MLS rookie scoring record. Brown finished second behind teammate Dillon Powers for MLS Rookie of the Year. He also scored the third-fastest goal in MLS history after just 15 seconds in the 5–1 win against Seattle on 5 October.

Brown was sold to Norwegian side Vålerenga on 17 March 2015.

Brown scored his first goal and his second goal on 17 April 2015 in a game against the Haugesund. The goals came in the 35th and 36th minutes and the game resulted in a 2 – 0 win.

Brown was sold to China League One side Shenzhen on 6 July 2016 for a fee of around $1.2 million. He scored a hat-trick in his debut against Shanghai Shenxin F.C.

Brown moved from the Tampa Bay Rowdies to D.C. United on 20 June 2017 after the Houston Dynamo traded away their spot in the Major League Soccer allocation order. Brown made his debut for United the next day on 21 June 2017, against Atlanta United. He came on in the 62nd minute for José Guillermo Ortiz. He scored his first goal for United against FC Dallas on 4 July 2017. On 28 November 2017 his contract option with United was declined.

In January 2018, Brown signed with Lorca FC in Spain.

On 18 September 2018, it was announced that Brown had again returned to the United States, joining USL side OKC Energy FC.

Bengaluru
On 1 January 2020, Brown joined reigning Indian Super League Champions Bengaluru FC on a one and a half year deal through the end of the 2020–21 season.

NorthEast United
On 15 January 2021, Brown was signed by NorthEast United. Brown scored 5 goals in 10 Match for the Highlanders in 2021–21 season.

On 14 September 2021, NorthEast United and Deshorn Brown have agreed a one-year contract extension for the upcoming season. He began the 2021–22 season campaign with a goal against Bengaluru FC on 20 November, in a 4–2 defeat. He scored a hat-trick against Mumbai City on 27 December in a 3–3 draw. He played two season for Highlanders and made a total of 22 appearances and scored 12 goals for the club.

International career
Deshorn received his first call-up to Jamaica senior national on 7 October 2013 after scoring what was at the time the second fastest goal in MLS history. Brown scored his first international goal against Barbados on 2 March 2014.

Career statistics

Club

International

Honours
Jamaica
 Caribbean Cup: 2014

References

External links
 
 
 
 

1990 births
Living people
Jamaican footballers
Jamaican expatriate footballers
Jamaica international footballers
UCF Knights men's soccer players
Des Moines Menace players
Reading United A.C. players
Colorado Rapids players
Vålerenga Fotball players
Shenzhen F.C. players
Tampa Bay Rowdies players
Lorca FC players
OKC Energy FC players
Bengaluru FC players
NorthEast United FC players
Sacramento Republic FC players
Association football forwards
Colorado Rapids draft picks
USL League Two players
Major League Soccer players
Eliteserien players
China League One players
Segunda División players
USL Championship players
2014 Caribbean Cup players
2015 Copa América players
Expatriate soccer players in the United States
Expatriate footballers in Norway
Expatriate footballers in China
Expatriate footballers in Spain
Expatriate footballers in India
Jamaican expatriate sportspeople in the United States
Jamaican expatriate sportspeople in Norway
Jamaican expatriate sportspeople in Spain
Jamaican expatriate sportspeople in India
People from Manchester Parish